Smartwool is an American clothing company. It was founded in 1994 in Steamboat Springs, Colorado by ski instructors Peter and Patty Duke. In 2005 The Timberland Company acquired Smartwool and in 2011 Smartwool became a subsidiary of VF Corporation upon VF Corporation's acquisition of The Timberland Company.

Overview
The company makes eponymous products primarily from treated merino wool. Smartwool claims that this is a  proprietary chlorine-based* treatment that makes its products itch-free and resistant to shrinking. Smartwool is also claimed to have moisture-wicking performance and odor-reducing, anti-microbial properties; it is thus marketed primarily as performance apparel.  Reviews for Smartwool products are typically found in the context of equipment for hiking and other outdoor activities. They offer products for women, men, and kids. 

Hercosett is a *chlorine-based shrink proofing treatment invented in the 1950's by the Wool Board in the UK to make wool more commercial.

In 2005, Smartwool implemented the requirement that its New Zealand wool suppliers no longer practice mulesing. In 2010, Smartwool signed a contract to exclusively source its Merino wool from the New Zealand Merino Company. Smartwool now uses merino wool sourced from China and other as yet undisclosed sources. It also has moved to a blended yarn to improve durability.

References

External links

Smartwool at Goodonyou
Merinotex Sport Wool Website

Socks
Hosiery brands
VF Corporation
Outdoor clothing brands
Technical fabrics
2011 mergers and acquisitions